Thomas Branch is a stream in Cooper County in the U.S. state of Missouri. It is a tributary of the Missouri River.

Thomas Branch was named after a local family near its course.

See also
List of rivers of Missouri

References

Rivers of Cooper County, Missouri
Rivers of Missouri